Simon Warner (born 1967) is an English musician and songwriter, known mainly for his 1997 orchestral pop album Waiting Rooms. Briefly active in both the 1980s and 1990s, Warner proved to be a polarising figure whose blatantly theatrical musical and performance style (inspired in part by Jacques Brel and Anthony Newley) attracted praise and condemnation in roughly equal measure.

After the release of Waiting Rooms (a commercial failure with reviews which ranged from the ecstatic to the dismissive), Warner briefly worked as a string arranger for Sneaker Pimps and began work on a never-completed second album before quitting the industry and the public eye altogether (becoming a minor cult British pop figure in the process). Warner broke cover in a Mojo interview in summer 2014, in which he implied that he still had an interest in returning to music in the future.

Discography

Singles

'It's A Perfect Day, Baby' (EG Records, 1985)
'The Wrong Girl' (Rough Trade Records, 1997)
'Wake Up The Streets' (Rough Trade Records, 1997)

Albums

Waiting Rooms (Rough Trade Records/One Little Indian Records, 1997)

References

 "Pop: Pulp faction's rising star" by Ben Thompson, The Independent, 19 September 1997 (interview with Simon Warner) 
 "Orchestral concept pop is redeemed by a musical philosopher." - review of Waiting Rooms by John O'Reilly, The Guardian, 1997
 Mojo Filter: Buried Treasure "Paradise Postponed" by Danny Ecclestone, MOJO Magazine #248, July 2014 (page 108)
 "The Erratic Career of a Torch Singer & Suburban Decadent" by Robert Cochrane, Culture Catch webzine, 18 June 2007
 "This Home is Haunted: A blather about Simon Warner's 'Waiting Rooms'" by Rarg, Universal Horse webzine, 8 May 2014

1967 births
Living people
English songwriters
English male singers
Musicians from London
British male songwriters